Ricardo-Horacio Neumann (12 July 1946 – 29 May 2008) was an Argentine professional footballer who played for Chacarita Juniors in the Primera División Argentina and 1. FC Köln in the Bundesliga. Neumann was an important part of Chacarita Juniors championship-winning squad during the 1969 season. He then joined Bastia and Paris FC before coming back to Chacarita Juniors. He also played the 1978–79 season with Red Star. In May 2008, Neumann died of heart failure in Argentina.

References

1946 births
2008 deaths
People from La Pampa Province
Argentine footballers
Argentine expatriate footballers
Association football midfielders
Chacarita Juniors footballers
1. FC Köln players
SC Bastia players
Paris FC players
Ligue 1 players
Ligue 2 players
Bundesliga players
Red Star F.C. players
Expatriate footballers in Germany
Expatriate footballers in France
Argentine expatriate sportspeople in Germany
Argentine expatriate sportspeople in France
Argentine people of German descent